Modeling chocolate, also called chocolate leather, plastic chocolate or candy clay, is a chocolate paste made by melting chocolate and combining it with corn syrup, glucose syrup, or golden syrup. 

Primarily used by upscale cakemakers and pâtisseries to add decoration to cakes and pastries, modeling chocolate is formed into a variety of shapes and structures that cannot be easily accomplished with other softer edible materials such as buttercream frosting, marzipan, or fondant.  Modeling chocolate can be made from white, dark, or milk chocolate.

See also
 Types of chocolate

References

External links
 Instructional: Learn how to make a rose from modeling chocolate..
 Recipe and instructions from Kristen Coniaris, author of the book, Cake Decorating with Modeling Chocolate.

Types of chocolate